Erik Tobias Sandberg (born 27 February 2000) is a Norwegian football player who plays as a defender for Jerv.

Personal life 
In 2016 the music video for "Kygo Jo" was uploaded to YouTube by Flow Kingz, a group consisting of Sandberg and his Norway U18 teammates Erik Botheim and Erling Haaland. The video had by 2022 surpassed 10 million views and 300,000 likes.

References

2000 births
Living people
People from Lillestrøm
Norwegian footballers
Eliteserien players
Norwegian First Division players
Lillestrøm SK players
Skeid Fotball players
FK Jerv players
Association football defenders
Norway youth international footballers